Swash may refer to:

 Swash, the water that washes up on shore after an incoming wave has broken
 Swash (brand), a range of laundry products produced by Procter & Gamble
 Swash (appliance), a Whirlpool corporation appliance
 Swash (typography), a typographical flourish on a glyph
 SWASH (water, sanitation and hygiene), a public health term used in schools

People with the surname Swash
 Joe Swash (born 1982), British actor
 Shana Swash (born 1990), British actress

See also
 Wash (disambiguation)
 Swashbuckler (disambiguation)